Holstein-Rendsburg is the name of a county that existed from 1290 to 1459, ruled by a line of the Schauenburg family.

Rise and fall of the county 
The Schauenburgs had ruled in Holstein since 1110/1111. In 1290, when Count Gerhard I of Holstein-Itzehoe died, his portion of Holstein was divided into 3 parts. From this emerged the counties of Holstein-Plön, Holstein-Pinneberg and Holstein-Rendsburg.

The below-mentioned counts ruled the territory until the last Count of Holstein-Rendsburg, Adolphus VIII, died in 1459. The Schauenburgs had almost died out; only the line of Holstein-Pinneberg still existed, but their count, Otto II of Schaumburg was not able to secure his inheritance.

Instead, in 1460, King Christian I of Denmark, a nephew of Adolphus VIII, who had helped him succeed to the Danish throne, was named as the new lord over the Duchy of Schleswig and County of Holstein.

Counts of Holstein-Rendsburg 
The following counts ruled over Holstein-Rendsburg or Holstein:

1290–1304 Henry I (1258 – 1304)
1304–1340 Gerhard III the Great (ca. 1293 – 1340), Duke of Schleswig
1340–1382 Henry II, nicknamed Iron Henry (1317 – 1384?)
1382–1397 Nicholas, aka Claus of Holstein (ca. 1321 – 1397)
1397–1403 Albert II (d. 1403)
1403–1404 Gerhard VI (d. 1404)
1404–1421 Henry III (d. 1421)
1421–1427 Henry IV (1397 – 1427)
1427–1433 Gerhard VII (1404 – 1433), Duke of Schleswig
1427–1459 Adolphus VIII (1401 – 1459), Duke of Schleswig

!Holstein-Rendsburg
House of Schauenburg
Noble families of the Holy Roman Empire
Holstein
Counties of the Holy Roman Empire
1290s establishments in the Holy Roman Empire
1290 establishments in Europe
1450s disestablishments in the Holy Roman Empire
1459 disestablishments in Europe